Les Velluire-sur-Vendée (literally Les Velluire on Vendée) is a commune in the Vendée department in the Pays de la Loire region in western France. It was established on 1 January 2019 by merger of the former communes of Le Poiré-sur-Velluire (the seat) and Velluire.

See also
Communes of the Vendée department

References

Communes of Vendée